The 2012 Catalan motorcycle Grand Prix was the fifth round of the 2012 Grand Prix motorcycle racing season and the 17th Catalan motorcycle Grand Prix. It took place on the weekend of 1–3 June 2012 at the Circuit de Catalunya in Montmeló, Barcelona, Spain. The three classes of motorcycle racing which took place during the weekend were MotoGP, Moto2 and Moto3.

Casey Stoner qualified on pole position in MotoGP, but it was his Repsol Honda teammate, Dani Pedrosa, who started in fifth place that took the lead at the first corner. Ben Spies was in second place for the first three laps, but slid off the track when challenging for the lead. This allowed the other factory Yamaha rider and championship leader Jorge Lorenzo to move up into second place and engage in a race long battle for the win with Pedrosa. Meanwhile, Stoner was behind the Tech 3 Yamaha of Andrea Dovizioso, and was battling with the other of Cal Crutchlow. He eventually beat Crutchlow to take fourth place whilst Dovizioso took the first podium of the year for the Tech 3 Yamaha team. As a consequence of the race, Lorenzo increased his lead in the riders' standings to 20 points over Stoner. Pedrosa remained third in the standings, with 30 fewer points than Lorenzo.

In Moto2, Marc Márquez took his fourth consecutive pole position by beating championship leader and fellow Spaniard Pol Espargaró by two-tenths of a second. Thomas Lüthi completed the front row with Andrea Iannone in fourth place; it was these four riders who dominated the race, staying in close company for the majority of it too. Iannone led almost every lap to take the victory, but had to resist pressure in the closing laps to take his first win of the season. Lüthi finished second and Márquez finished third after winning an appeal against a one-minute penalty issued by the FIM for a collision between himself and Espargaró, which had resulted in retirement of the Kalex rider with three laps remaining. The result rearranged the order in the riders' standings with Lüthi now leading the way on 88 points with Márquez only 2 behind. Not far behind them were Espargaró and Iannone, still firmly in contention, on 71 and 70 points respectively, the reduced gap down to the Italian's victory.

The Moto3 race was not as close as the one in the other two categories as Maverick Viñales won his home race from pole position. It was his second victory of the season. Zulfahmi Khairuddin's first front-row for any Malaysian rider, second place, failed to translate into a great result and he finished down in eighth. It was a close eighth though, as he and the six riders in front of him had squabbled in close proximity for the majority of the race allowing Viñales to break away. Sandro Cortese and Miguel Oliveira emerged victorious in the tight battle to the line to take second and third place to complete the podium. Álex Márquez set the fastest lap of the race. As a consequence of the race, Cortese was still leading the riders' standings on 87 points but, with victory, Viñales was now just 7 points behind him. Luis Salom remained third in the standings, but was now on a fairly distant 55 points, 32 fewer than Cortese.

Report

MotoGP

Background and qualifying
Jorge Lorenzo entered the event leading the Riders' standings following his win at the preceding event – the French Grand Prix. Reigning world champion Casey Stoner was second in the standings, eight points behind Lorenzo, whilst his Honda teammate, Dani Pedrosa, was seventeen points behind him. Yamaha led the way in the Manufacturers' standings, all 90 of their points courtesy of Lorenzo. Honda were 4 points behind them, and Ducati remained in third place after Valentino Rossi scored their first podium of the season in Le Mans. Colin Edwards returned to his CRT ride after breaking his collarbone at the Portuguese Grand Prix four weeks previously; he had been replaced with Chris Vermeulen for the French Grand Prix. Bridgestone took asymmetric tyres to the race for the bikes to compensate for the large number of long, right-handed corners on the track.

Stoner took pole position in qualifying for the event, his second of the season, and the third for his team. Lorenzo qualified in second position, one tenth slower than the pole time. Crutchlow completed the front row by qualifying third for the third time in the season for the Tech 3 Yamaha team. A resurgent Ben Spies set a time fast enough for fourth position, but was still only the third fastest Yamaha on the grid. Stoner's teammate Pedrosa, the polesitter from the previous race, qualified fifth, after he ran off the track on his final timed run. He was in front of the other Tech 3 Yamaha of Andrea Dovizioso, who completed the closely matched top six with a time just fourth tenths slower than Stoner's. The first Ducati rider was Nicky Hayden, who started the third row of the grid. He was followed by the LCR Honda of Stefan Bradl, who took his best qualifying position of the season so far, and then Valentino Rossi. Álvaro Bautista was accompanied by Barberá and Karel Abraham on the fourth row of the grid. Behind them, in thirteenth, Randy de Puniet was the highest qualifying CRT rider. Colin Edwards was fourteenth behind him on his return alongside Aleix Espargaró, de Puniet's teammate. Michele Pirro, James Ellison, Mattia Pasini, Yonny Hernández, Danilo Petrucci and Iván Silva were sixteenth to twenty-first respectively, completing the grid on the final two rows.

Cal Crutchlow set the fastest time in the warm-up session for the event in slippery conditions on the morning of the race, with Stoner second fastest and Rossi third, narrowly ahead of an impressive Bautista. The conditions lead to crashes from some riders, including falls from Pedrosa, James Ellison and Héctor Barberá.

Race
All the riders chose to race on the softer tyre on both the front and rear, except from the two Repsol Hondas of Stoner and Pedrosa, who started with the harder tyre on both front and rear.

At the start of the race, Pedrosa took the lead at the first turn, despite his fifth place starting spot. Ben Spies, who had moved up into second, attempted to overtake Pedrosa around the outside of turn 3, but had to give best. His teammate, Lorenzo, had dropped down to third in front of polesitter Stoner. The two Tech 3 Yamahas were fifth and sixth, with Dovizioso ahead of Crutchlow. Later on in the first lap, Dovizioso overtook Stoner for fourth place while Nicky Hayden dropped from seventh to tenth – first behind Stefan Bradl, then behind teammate Rossi and next behind Álvaro Bautista. Stoner then ran slightly wide, allowing Crutchlow to take fifth place. On the third lap, Spies once again tried to take the lead from Pedrosa at Turn 3, and temporarily did. However, he continued to run off into the gravel before falling off his bike and having to rejoin the track down in last place.

The order then began to settle down, and the top five of Pedrosa, Lorenzo, Dovizioso, Crutchlow and Stoner began to pull out a gap to the rest the field. Behind them, Bautista, Bradl, and the Ducatis of Rossi and Hayden continued to fight over the following four places. Lorenzo took the lead from Pedrosa at the first turn on the sixth lap of the race, and started to build a gap immediately. Meanwhile, Stoner overtook Crutchlow to regain the position he had lost on the first lap, but the pair had already fallen two seconds behind the leading three bikes by this point.

On lap 11, Pedrosa retook the lead from Lorenzo on the main straight, while Dovizioso remained close behind the pair. On the following lap, whilst trying to regain the position, Lorenzo overshot at the corner and was forced to ride across the kerbs to avoid the gravel. Dovizioso fell back to the ongoing battle between Stoner and Crutchlow on lap 15, whilst another battle between Bautista (sixth) and Rossi (seventh) began to catch up.
After numerous attempts, Lorenzo managed to pass Pedrosa again to take the lead of the race with 6 laps remaining with a manoeuvre down the inside of turn 10. Pedrosa had a large, unintentional wheelie entering the corner due to problems with his bike, possibly allowing the pass to happen. The two riders now had a large lead over everyone else, but Pedrosa began to fall back from Lorenzo in the final three laps. On the 23rd and penultimate lap, Ben Spies managed to return into the top 10 by overtaking Héctor Barberá (Spies had been running in eleventh since lap 12, half-way through the race). On the final lap, Stoner managed to pull away from Crutchlow and catch up with Dovizioso; however, he wasn't able to make a pass and take a podium place.

Jorge Lorenzo won the race to take his third victory of the season in front of his home fans, extending his championship lead over Stoner to 20 points. Lorenzo also set the fastest lap of the race. Dani Pedrosa finished second, a result he was disappointed with because he felt he could have won the race. He remained in third place in the standings, 30 points adrift of Lorenzo. Andrea Dovizioso completed the podium, taking Yamaha Tech 3's, and his, first podium of the season. Dovizioso described the good result as a "beautiful" moment.
He was closely pursued by Stoner at the end of a race, whose fourth-place finish was his first off the podium in 2012. Stoner conceded that the decision to use the harder tyres instead of the soft was a wrong one because it cost him too much time at the start of the race. Cal Crutchlow's fifth place left him behind his teammate in the championship, but was a good result nonetheless. Crutchlow said the result could have been better if a "lack of experience" hadn't lead to him being conservative at the beginning of the race. Álvaro Bautista finished the race in sixth position, ahead of Valentino Rossi on the improving Ducati bike. Stefan Bradl finished eighth, where he had started, and Nicky Hayden finished ninth. The Yamaha team stated that they were pleased with Ben Spies' performance, despite his fall near the start of the race – he finished in tenth place. The Ducati riders of Barberá and Abraham finished in eleventh and twelfth, ahead of the top finishing CRT rider of Aleix Espargaró (who simultaneously became the highest ranking CRT rider in standings). Michele Pirro and Randy de Puniet, Espargaró's teammate, completed the points in fourteenth and fifteenth. The other five classified riders were Ellison, Pasini, Hernández, Petrucci and Silva; Edwards was not classified as he finished in the pitlane, one lap down.

Moto2

Moto3
KTM rider Sandro Cortese entered the event leading the Riders' standings on total of 67 points. 12 points behind him was his championship rival, the FTR Honda of Maverick Viñales. The Kalex KTM of Luis Salom was third in the standings, six points behind Viñales. In the Manufacturers' standings, FTR and KTM were joint in the lead, each with a total of 68 points. Kalex had accumulated the third highest total of 56 points.

In qualifying for the race, Maverick Viñales took his second pole position of the season, and his second in succession, by setting a time nearly three-tenths faster than the rest of the field. Zulfahmi Khairuddin became the first Malaysian to ever achieve a front row start in a motorcycle Grand Prix, when he set the second fastest time for KTM. The winner of the previous race, and Viñales' FTR Honda teammate, Louis Rossi, took the final front row spot of third place. Sandro Cortese qualified fourth after suffering a heavy crash in that morning's practice session. He suffered heavy bruising to his right hand, and had to have blood drained during the session. Fifth place went to Miguel Oliveira, the Suter rider, who was at the centre of drama late on in the session, as his swift move across the track took out Alan Techer and Brad Binder. None of the riders were hurt in the incident. The second row was completed by Binder's teammate Luis Salom, who like Viñales and various other riders, was in front of his home crowd. Alexis Masbou qualified seventh for his 100th Grand Prix start. Efrén Vázquez, Héctor Faubel and Álex Márquez completed the top ten. Romano Fenati, winner of the Spanish Grand Prix earlier in 2012, had a disappointing session, and could only manage thirteenth. All 34 riders successfully set a lap time, and all started the following day's race.

In the warm up session, on the day of the race, Viñales once again set the fastest time, with Rossi second and Vázquez third, albeit seven-tenths off the pace.

Classification

MotoGP

Moto2

Moto3

Championship standings after the race (MotoGP)
Below are the standings for the top five riders and constructors after round five has concluded.

Riders' Championship standings

Constructors' Championship standings

 Note: Only the top five positions are included for both sets of standings.

References

Catalan motorcycle Grand Prix
Catalan
Catalan Motorcycle Grand Prix
motorcycle
Catalan motorcycle Grand Prix